Louis Adrien Bach (14 April 1883 in Paris – 16 September 1914 in Servon-Melzicourt) was a French football player who played as a defender and competed in the 1900 Olympic Games. In Paris he won a silver medal as a member of Club Française club team. He was killed in action during World War I.

According to M.C.E. Reeves, the captain of the Norwood and Selhurst Football Club interviewed by the sports newspaper L'Auto in October 1900, he was one the best backwards he was given to watch playing.

See also
 List of Olympians killed in World War I

References

External links

1883 births
1914 deaths
French footballers
Association football defenders
Olympic silver medalists for France
Olympic footballers of France
Footballers at the 1900 Summer Olympics
French military personnel killed in World War I
Olympic medalists in football
Medalists at the 1900 Summer Olympics
Footballers from Paris